My Golden Days, also titled My Golden Years, is a 2015 French drama film directed by Arnaud Desplechin. It stars Quentin Dolmaire, Lou Roy-Lecollinet, and Mathieu Amalric. It is a prequel to the 1996 film My Sex Life... or How I Got into an Argument. It was screened as part of the Directors' Fortnight section of the 2015 Cannes Film Festival, where it won the SACD Prize.

Plot
Due to a passport problem, an anthropologist Paul is stopped and interrogated at the airport in Paris. He recalls the memories of his youth.

Told in three segments: (1: “Childhood”) Paul argues with his mother and goes and stays with an aunt. His mother dies and his angry father attacks him. (2: “Russia”) Paul is questioned about a passport irregularity. He explains that he went on a school trip to Russia. His Jewish friend agreed to act as a courier, handing over money and books. Paul gave up his passport (3: “Esther”) Paul falls in love with his sister’s friend Esther, beautiful, promiscuous, and unhappy. They meet at parties and begin a long-term relationship, though each has other lovers. Paul studies in Paris but returns home when he can. His tutor dies and he works on a research project in Tajikistan. (“Epilogue”) Paul bumps into Jean-Paul and his wife. Paul says Jean-Paul betrayed him while he was away.

Cast

Release
The film had is world premiere in the Directors' Fortnight section at the 2015 Cannes Film Festival on 15 May 2015. It was released in France on 20 May 2015.

Reception

Critical reception
On review aggregator website Rotten Tomatoes, the film holds an approval rating of 88% based on 69 reviews, with an average rating of 7.5/10. The website's critical consensus reads, "My Golden Years is a complex, well-acted coming-of-age drama." On Metacritic, the film has a weighted average score of 87 out of 100, based on 24 critics, indicating "universal acclaim".

Accolades

References

External links
  
 

2015 films
2015 drama films
2010s French-language films
French drama films
Films directed by Arnaud Desplechin
Films with screenplays by Arnaud Desplechin
Films set in the 1980s
Films whose director won the Best Director Lumières Award
Films whose director won the Best Director César Award
2010s French films